Tabriz Technical and Vocational College (TTC) is a public technology institute in Tabriz, Iran, under the supervision of the Iran Technical and Vocational University. It is one of the largest technical institutes in Iran.

See also
 Enghelāb-e Eslāmi Technical College

References

External links
Official Website

Universities in Iran
Education in Tabriz
Technical and Vocational University campuses
Buildings and structures in Tabriz
Educational institutions established in 1977
1977 establishments in Iran